The 2023 season will be the Cincinnati Bengals' upcoming 54th season in the National Football League, their 56th overall and their fifth under head coach Zac Taylor.
They will attempt to improve upon their 12-4 record from 2022, as well as clinch their third consecutive AFC North title.

Offseason

Free agents

Unrestricted

Restricted

Exclusive-Rights

Signings

Releases

Draft

Staff

Current roster

Preseason
The Bengals' preseason opponents and schedule will be announced in the spring.

Regular season

2023 opponents
Listed below are the Bengals' opponents for 2023. Exact dates and times will be announced in the spring.

References

External links
 

Cincinnati
Cincinnati Bengals seasons
Cincinnati Bengals